Fabio Bonacina (26 July 1923 – March 2012) was an Italian gymnast. He competed in eight events at the 1952 Summer Olympics.

References

External links
 

1923 births
2012 deaths
Italian male artistic gymnasts
Olympic gymnasts of Italy
Gymnasts at the 1952 Summer Olympics
Sportspeople from Lecco